Roger Blin (Neuilly-sur-Seine, France, 22 March 1907 – Évecquemont, France, 21 January 1984) was a French actor and director. He staged world premieres of Samuel Beckett's Waiting for Godot in 1953 and Endgame in 1957.

Biography
Blin was the son of a doctor; however, despite his father's wishes, Blin forged a career in the theatre. As a teenager he was 'fascinated' by the Surrealists and their conception of revolutionary art.:35

He was initially part of the left-wing theatre collectives The Company of Five and The October Group. In 1935 Blin served as Antonin Artaud's assistant director for his production of Les Cenci [The Cenci] at the Folies-Wagrams theatre in 1935.:35 Following his work with Artaud, Blin focused on 'political street-theatre.':46 

During the war, Blin was a liaison between the Resistance and the French Army.

His extensive career as both director and actor in both film and theatre has been largely defined by his work and relationship with Artaud, Samuel Beckett and Jean Genet. In addition to being a close friend and confidant of Artaud during the latter's nine years of internment, he directed the first performances of Beckett's Waiting For Godot, Happy Days and Endgame as well as directing the initial performance of Genet's The Blacks and the controversial The Screens. Genet's key correspondences to Blin have been published by Editions Gallimard.

The 1986 Faber and Faber publication, "Samuel Beckett: The Complete Dramatic Works" carries only three dedications from Beckett: "Endgame" is dedicated to Blin, while "Come and Go" is for John Calder, and "Catastrophe" is for Václav Havel.

Partial filmography 

 Street Without a Name (1934)
 Zouzou (1934) - Le témoin du meurtre (uncredited)
 Les mutinés de l'Elseneur (1936) - Un marin
 Razumov: Sous les yeux d'occident (1936) - (uncredited)
 Life Belongs to Us (1936) - Un métallo
 Jenny (1936) - Le Malade solitaire
 Beethoven's Great Love (1936) - de Ries
 The Citadel of Silence (1937) - Un officier
 La dame de pique (1937) - (uncredited)
 The Alibi (1937) - Kretz, l'homme de main de Winckler
 Le temps des cerises (1938) - Le fils Dupuis
 Rasputin (1938) - Le jeune paysan (uncredited)
 The Lafarge Case (1938) - Le journalier
 Adrienne Lecouvreur (1938) - l'alchimiste
 The Curtain Rises (1938) - Dominique
 The White Slave (1939) - Maïr
 Louise (1939) - Un rapin (uncredited)
 The World Will Shake (1939) - Le condamné
 Battement de coeur (1940)
 Volpone (1941) - Un vénitien (uncredited)
 L'âge d'or (1942)
 The Trump Card (1942) - Un aspirant
 Les Visiteurs du Soir (1942) - Le montreur de monstres
 Captain Fracasse (1943) - Fagotin / Fagottino
 Goodbye Leonard (1943) - Le chef bohémien
 Le Corbeau (1943) - François
 Love Story (1943) - L'homme du théâtre (uncredited)
 Colonel Chabert (1943) - Un Clerc
 First on the Rope (1944) - Paul Moury
 La vie de bohème (1945)
 The Last Judgment (1945)
 The Ideal Couple (1946) - Le somnambule
 Passionnelle (1947) - Julien
 Wicked City (1949) - Emilio
 Histoires extraordinaires (1949) - Guillaume
 Orpheus (1950) - The Poet
 Vagabonds imaginaires (1950) - Le récitant (segment 'Les amours jaunes') (voice)
 The Convict (1951) - Un bagnard
 Adventures of Captain Fabian (1951) - Philippe
 The King and the Mockingbird (1952) - L'aveugle (voice)
 Piédalu fait des miracles (1952)
 Le Chevalier de la nuit (1953) - Le domestique
 Your Turn, Callaghan (1955) - Wladimir
 The Hunchback of Notre Dame (1956) - Mathias Hungadi
 Les Tripes au soleil (1959) - Slim
 Paris Blues (1961) - Fausto the Moor (uncredited)
 A Taste for Women (1964) - Larsen
 Marie Soleil (1964) - Karl / Boss
 Les ruses du diable (Neuf portraits d'une jeune fille) (1966) - Monsieur de Beaurepaire
 Le Dimanche de la vie (1967) - Jean Sans-Tête
 La loi du survivant (1967) - Pao
 Trop petit mon ami (1970) - Boris
 Traîté du rossignol (1971) - Lars Larsen
 Dada au coeur (1974) - Max
 L'important c'est d'aimer (1975) - Servais's father
 Aloïse (1975) - Le professeur de chant
 Lily, aime-moi (1975) - Lily's father
 Il faut vivre dangereusement (1975) - Murdoc
 Nevermore, Forever (1976) - Daniel
 The Old Country Where Rimbaud Died (1977) - Le père de Jeanne
 Solveig et le violon turc (1977)
 The Adolescent (1979) - Romain
 Five and the Skin (1982) - Récitant (voice)

References

External links

1907 births
1984 deaths
French male film actors
French male stage actors
French film directors
French theatre directors
People from Neuilly-sur-Seine
20th-century French male actors